Lemuel Willard Royse (January 19, 1847 – December 18, 1946) was an American lawyer, jurist, and politician who served two terms as a U.S. Representative from Indiana from 1895 to 1899.

Biography
Born near Pierceton, Indiana, Royse attended the common schools.
He studied law.
He was admitted to the bar in 1874 and commenced practice in Warsaw, Indiana.

He served as prosecuting attorney for the thirty-third judicial circuit of Indiana in 1876.
He served as mayor of Warsaw 1885-1891.
He served as member of the Republican State central committee from 1886 to 1890.
He served as delegate to the Republican National Convention in 1892.

Congress 
Royse was elected as a Republican to the Fifty-fourth and Fifty-fifth Congresses (March 4, 1895 – March 3, 1899).
He served as chairman of the Committee on Elections No. 2 (Fifty-fifth Congress).
He was an unsuccessful candidate for renomination in 1898.

Later career and death 
He resumed the practice of law in Warsaw, Indiana.
He served as judge of the Kosciusko County Circuit Court 1904-1908.

He resumed the practice of his profession.
He was reelected circuit judge and served from 1920 to 1932.
He again resumed the practice of law until his retirement in 1940.

He died in Warsaw, Indiana, December 18, 1946, one month shy of his 100th birthday.
He was interred in Oakwood Cemetery.

References

1847 births
1946 deaths
Indiana state court judges
Mayors of places in Indiana
People from Kosciusko County, Indiana
People from Warsaw, Indiana
Republican Party members of the United States House of Representatives from Indiana